Sant Joan (official name; English: Saint John) is a municipality on Majorca, Spain, situated in the center of the island in the comarca of Pla de Mallorca. The town Sant Joan, formerly known as Sant Joan de Sineu, was founded in 1300. It is bordered by the municipalities of Petra, Villafranca de Bonany, Porreres, Montuïri, Lloret de Vistalegre, and Sineu.

Sports 
In the town there are two futsal clubs, Sant Joan C.E. and Just Just Sant Joan.

Sant Joan C.E. was founded in 2007. Currently the team plays at 1ª Regional de la Federació de Futbol de les Illes Balears from Balearic Islands. It is the most honored team of the town, winning two Balearic Futsal Cups at 2009 (Senior Squad) and 2011 (Youth Squad).

References

External links 

Municipalities in Mallorca
1300 establishments in Europe
Populated places established in the 1300s
13th-century establishments in Aragon